Hebbal or Hebbal (N) is a small village in Hukkeri taluk Belgaum district, Karnataka, India. It is located on the banks of Hiranyakeshi river. The Bangalore-Pune National Highway passes through this village.

The village comprises around 1500 houses. Most inhabitants are farmers and employees in government and private sector.
This village is also known for the Mahalakshmi temple and Gupthadevi temple.

References 

Villages in Belagavi district